Sir Richard Hoare (1648 – 6 January 1719) was the founder of C. Hoare & Co, the oldest extant bank in the United Kingdom.

Business career
Raised near Smithfield Market in London, Richard Hoare began his working life apprenticed to the goldsmith Richard Moore from 9 June 1665 for seven years. He was granted the Freedom of the Worshipful Company of Goldsmiths on 5 July 1672. This date marks the foundation of C. Hoare & Co as a goldsmith's business at the sign of the Golden Bottle in Cheapside, London.

Political career 
Hoare, a Tory, stood for election as Sheriff of London in June 1702 but was unsuccessful. He was knighted by Queen Anne in October 1702. He attained the office of alderman in September 1703. At the election of May 1705, he first stood for the constituency of London, but could only manage fifth place as the City Tories were soundly defeated. He also failed in the City election of 1708, finishing seventh as the Whigs once again dominated the poll.

Contesting the mayoral election of September 1710 he unsuccessfully challenged the Whig leader (Sir) Gilbert Heathcote but was appointed Sheriff of London instead and was elected to Parliament in the same year, finishing second in the poll. He finally became Lord Mayor of London in September 1712 having also contested the election in 1711. The City election of 1713 saw Hoare returned to Parliament having again finished second but he did not stand in 1715. He subsequently withdrew from public life in 1718 due to ill-health. Hoare died at Hendon on 6 January 1719. 

A monument to his memory stands in the church of St Dunstan-in-the-West and was designed and created by Thomas Stayner.

Family 
Hoare married Susanna Austen; they had 17 children (one of whom was Henry Hoare I).

References

Further reading

1648 births
1719 deaths
17th-century English businesspeople
18th-century English people
English bankers
Richard
18th-century lord mayors of London
Sheriffs of the City of London
Members of the Parliament of Great Britain for English constituencies
Knights Bachelor